The Islamic Republic of Iran Navy Aviation (IRINA) or Havadarya is the air component of the Islamic Republic of Iran Navy. It is one of the few air elements in any Persian Gulf navy, and has both fixed-wing aircraft and armed helicopters.

Aircraft

American aircraft types were introduced to the inventory, in the 1960s and 1970s: with European made aircraft comprising the more modern part of the fleet. Anti-submarine warfare (ASW) helicopters seem to be focused more on a transport role than actual ASW.

References 

 http://www.globalsecurity.org/military/world/iran/ships.htm
 https://web.archive.org/web/20161022141734/http://www.63rdvfs.com/INoob.html

Military aviation in Iran
Islamic Republic of Iran Navy
Naval aviation services